Armstrong Circle Theatre is an American anthology drama television series which ran from June 6, 1950, to June 25, 1957, on NBC, and from October 2, 1957, to August 28, 1963, on CBS. It alternated weekly with The U.S. Steel Hour. It finished in the Nielsen ratings at #19 for the 1950-1951 season and #24 for 1951-1952. The principal sponsor was Armstrong World Industries.

Between July 8 and September 16, 1959, CBS aired reruns of six documentary dramas originally broadcast during the 1958–1959 season as episodes of Armstrong Circle Theatre under the title Armstrong by Request. Armstrong by Request aired during Armstrong Circle Theatre′s time slot and also alternated with The United States Steel Hour.

Synopsis
The program's first season featured episodes that tried "to please every body in a mass audience, using only highly formularized plays. The next season brought a different approach, with more emphasis on characters than on plot. Edward B. Roberts worked with writers from all over the United States to find scripts. By mid-November 1952, he estimated that he had talked to 3,000 writers and looked at 20,000 scripts. Authors received $750 for each accepted script.

The series featured original dramas by noted writers, although sometimes comedies were shown. Its guidelines specifically called for the avoidance of violence. Originally a half-hour production, in 1955 the show expanded to an hour and began to emphasize dramatized versions of real-life contemporary events (including the sinking of the SS Andrea Doria and a documentary on the history of Communism in the Soviet Union. Upon moving to CBS, the show emphasized several Cold War topics, including espionage, Radio Free Europe and escapes from East Germany.

David Susskind, producer of the program, called the new episodes "actuals", describing them as "dramatizations based on truth".

Hosts and narrators
Nelson Case (1950-1951)
Joe Ripley (1952-1953) 
Bob Sherry (1953-1954) 
Sandy Becker (1954-1955) 
John Cameron Swayze (1955-1957) 
Douglas Edwards (1957-1961)
Ron Cochran (1961-1962) 
Henry Hamilton (1962-1963)

Guest stars
The series featured numerous guest stars including:

 Tige Andrews
 Edward Asner
 Anne Bancroft
 Ed Begley
 Barbara Britton
 James Broderick
 John Cassavetes
 Dabney Coleman
 Jackie Cooper
 James Dean
 Patty Duke
 Robert Duvall
 Peter Falk
 Geraldine Fitzgerald
 Nina Foch
 Wallace Ford
 Alan Furlan
 Jonathan Harris
 Hurd Hatfield
 Grace Kelly
 Jack Klugman
 Otto Kruger
 Cloris Leachman
 Jack Lemmon
 Julie London
 Audra Lindley
 Gene Lockhart
 Karl Malden
 Walter Matthau
 Roddy McDowell
 Darren McGavin
 Patrick McVey
 Elizabeth Montgomery
 Rosemary Murphy
 Paul Newman
 Lois Nettleton
 Leslie Nielsen
 Carroll O'Connor
 Susan Oliver
 Anthony Perkins
 Lee Remick
 Jason Robards
 Cliff Robertson
 Gena Rowlands
 Telly Savalas
 George Segal
 Martin Sheen
 Kim Stanley
 Maureen Stapleton
 Harold J. Stone
 Suzanne Storrs
 Beatrice Straight
 Ron Thompson
 Jo Van Fleet
 Eli Wallach
 Jack Whiting
 Gene Wilder
 Joanne Woodward

Directors
Paul Bogart
William Corrigan
Marc Daniels
Robert Ellis Miller
Robert Mulligan
Daniel Petrie
Ted Post
James Sheldon
Garry Simpson
Robert Stevens

Episodes

1950-1951

1952-1953

1954

1955-1956

1956-1957

1957-1958

1962-1963

References

External links
  
 Armstrong Circle Theatre at CVTA

1950 American television series debuts
1963 American television series endings
1950s American anthology television series
1960s American anthology television series
Black-and-white American television shows
English-language television shows
CBS original programming
NBC original programming